Nikola Stevanović (born 13 September 1998) is a Serbian professional footballer who plays as a centre-back for German club FC Ingolstadt.

Club career

Radnički Niš
Born in Niš, Stevanović started training football with Naša krila Belotinac and later spent some period in the "Filip Filipović" youth school. He joined youth categories of Radnički Niš at the age of 11. As a member of youth squad, Stevanović joined the first team under coach Milan Rastavac for the spring half of 2015–16 season. He noted his senior debut in the Serbian Cup match against Partizan, played on 2 March 2016. Later, he also made SuperLiga in 29 fixture match against Vojvodina. Stevanović signed his first three-year professional contract with Radnički Niš on 19 July 2016. In summer 2018, Stevanović moved on a six-month loan to Dinamo Vranje.

FC Ingolstadt
On 10 January 2022, Stevanović moved to FC Ingolstadt in German 2. Bundesliga.

International career
Stevanović was invited in Serbia under-18 national team squad in March 2016 under coach Milan Kosanović. He noted 4 appearances for the team. He had also been called in Serbian under-19 level in October same year.

Career statistics

Club

References

External links
 Nikola Stevanović stats at utakmica.rs 
 
 
 
 

1998 births
Living people
Sportspeople from Niš
Serbian footballers
Association football central defenders
Serbia youth international footballers
Serbia international footballers
FK Radnički Niš players
FK Dinamo Vranje players
FC Ingolstadt 04 players
Serbian SuperLiga players
Serbian expatriate footballers
Expatriate footballers in Germany
Serbian expatriate sportspeople in Germany